Abhishek Ray is an Indian film composer, playback singer, instrumentalist, music arranger, and producer working in Bollywood. He is known for having composed the music and done playback vocals for popular and award-winning Bollywood films such as: Paan Singh Tomar, Welcome Back, Saheb, Biwi Aur Gangster, Wedding Anniversary, I Am Kalam, Shagird, Chaar Din Ki Chandni, Prem Mayee, Thoondil, Yeh Saali Zindagi, and Tera Kya Hoga Johnny. Apart from original music, his wildlife preservation and restoration efforts have been recognised across the world and he has been recently awarded with the '"Swabhiman Bharat "' for rewilding an entire hill as wild tiger-leopard corridor.  Ray is known to have invested all his savings in creating the famous Sitabani Wildlife Reserve, India's first private wildlife reserve with wild tiger and leopard presence and home to about 600 bird species.

Ray has composed and sung for solo albums like Udaas Paani, Raat Chand Aur Main, Kab aate ho with the legendary poet Gulzar. In May 2016, he launched a music label called AR Productions with a set of seven classic singles written by the lyricist Gulzar featuring singers like Shreya Ghoshal, Hariharan, Alka Yagnik, Abhijeet Bhattacharya, Udit Narayan and Kavita Krishnamurthy.

 Ray has many other world music albums to his credit like Jaisalmer-Call of the desert, Symphonies of the Taj, Echoes of Khajuraho, Ritu: The Magic of the Six Indian Seasons,Raga Rendezvous.

He composed "Aye Jahaan Aasmaan", the concerto of love with a hundred piece live orchestra and the voices of Sonu Nigam and Shreya Ghoshal. This song won the best song of the year at Mirchi Music Awards 2017 and his song Yeh Dil Ajeeb Hai written by Gulzar and sung by Hariharan simultaneously won the nomination in the same category.

He has also composed music for numerous documentaries like The Maharaja Of Jodhpur: The Legacy Lives On for which he received the 2006 Indian Telly Award for best Music. Others include The Shiamans Of The Himalayas, Apatanis of Arunachal Pradesh, Forced to Kill, and Nirvana for the Discovery Channel. He began his career composing and singing for TV shows and advertisements.

Ray sings, composes, arranges, and mixes his songs and film scores. He works out of his recording studios in Versova, Andheri, Mumbai and Asiad Village, New Delhi. He plays instruments including the piano, electronic keyboards, accordion, wavedrum, conga, thumba, darbouka, electronic drum, and bass.

Ray is also a naturalist and a bonafide government tiger and leopard tracker. He runs his own wildlife reserve next to Corbett National Park called the Sitabani Wildlife Reserve. He is known to have invested all that he earned from Bollywood into rewilding an entire barren hill into dense forest. Today Sitabani Wildlife Reserve is known for wild Bengal tiger and Leopard presence.

He is also the composer singer of India's national anthem on tiger conservation.

Filmography

Films

Non film albums

Film background scores

Playback

Abhishek Ray as playback singer

Music for documentaries

Sources

References

External links

Bollywood playback singers
Living people
Musicians from Mumbai
Indian male playback singers
Year of birth missing (living people)
Musicians from Kolkata